Ron Polansky is an American philosopher and educator. A Professor of Philosophy at Duquesne University, he edits the journal Ancient Philosophy. He also edits Mathesis Publications. Polansky teaches and works widely in ancient philosophy, but also has worked and taught bioethics and early modern political philosophy. He is married to Susan Polansky who teaches at Carnegie Mellon University.

Selected bibliography

Authored and edited books
(2007) Aristotle's De anima: A Commentary, Cambridge University Press
(2000) Bioethics: Ancient Themes in Contemporary Issues, co-edited with Mark Kuczewski, M.I.T. Press
(1992) Philosophy and Knowledge: A Commentary on Plato’s Theaetetus, Bucknell University Press

Selected articles
"Function, Ability, and Desire in Plato's Republic" co-authored with Antonis Coumoundouros in volume honoring G.X. Santas, Philosophical Inquiry Spring 2008, 1–14.
"Plot, Disease, and Bioethics" co-authored with Gabe Solomon M.D., Philosophical Inquiry Supplementary Volume Fall 2007, 29:154-169.
"Mistakes, Chance and Bioethics" co-authored with Gabe Solomon M.D., Philosophical Inquiry Supplementary Volume Fall 2007, 29: 170–182.
"The Bad Is Last but Does Not Last: Aristotle's Metaphysics Y 9" co-authored with Emily Katz, Oxford Studies in Ancient Philosophy November 2006, 31: 233–242.
"The Enduring Charm of Plato's Unwritten Doctrines" co-authored with Patrick Macfarlane, Philosophy, Competition and the Good Life. Vol 2. K. Boudouris and Kostas Kalimtzis editors. Ionia Publications: Athens, 2005, 262–271.
"The Logic of Socratic Inquiry: Illustrated by Plato's Charmides" co-authored with Mark Brouwer, Socrates: 2400 Years Since His Death, International Symposium Proceedings, Vassilis Karasmais ed. European Cultural Center of Delphi, 2004, 233–245.
"Disability in Earlier Greek Philosophers" co-authored with Patrick Macfarlane, Skepsis 15: 2004, 25–41.
"Moral Virtue and Megalopsychia " co-authored with James Stover, Ancient Philosophy 23: 2003, 351–359.
"Variety of Socratic Elenchi" co-authored with Micheele Carpenter in Gary A. Scott ed., Does Socrates Have a Method?: Rethinking the Elenchus in Plato's Dialogues and Beyond, Pennsylvania State University Press, 2002, 89–100.
"Politeia is Aristotle's 'Best Constitution'" Iphitos 1: 2000, 59–70.

See also
 American philosophy
 List of American philosophers

References

External links
Ron Polansky's webpage at Duquesne University
Ancient Philosophy homepage

21st-century American philosophers
Duquesne University faculty
Bioethicists
American scholars of ancient Greek philosophy
Living people
Year of birth missing (living people)